Balkampet Yellamma temple is a Hindu goddess temple located at Bjjr nagar Balkampet in Hyderabad. Yearly in ashadamasam kalayanavostam is done. It is very famous among Bonaalu and on Thursday Friday & Sundays.

Location
This temple is located at Balkampet in Hyderabad.

References

Hindu temples in Hyderabad, India